Nautiyal is an Indian (Sarola Brahmin) toponymic surname from Nauti, a village in the Chamoli district of Uttarakhand. Notable persons with this name include:
Anil Nautiyal, Indian politician
Asha Nautiyal (born 1969), Indian politician
Jubin Nautiyal (born 1989), Indian musician
Ram Prasad Nautiyal (1905–1980), Indian politician

Surnames of Indian origin
Indian surnames
Surnames of Hindustani origin
Hindu surnames
Toponymic surnames
Brahmin communities of Uttarakhand
People from Chamoli district